Swifty is a 1935 American Western film directed by Alan James, starring Hoot Gibson, June Gale, and George Hayes.

Cast
 Hoot Gibson as Swifty Wade
 June Gale as Helen McNeil
 George Hayes as Sheriff Dan Hughes
 Ralph Lewis as Alec McNeil
 Robert Kortman as Clam Givens
 William Gould as Cheevers
 Hal Taliaferro (credited as Wally Wales) as Price McNeil
 Lafe McKee as Sandy McGregor
 Art Mix as Squid

References

American black-and-white films
American Western (genre) films
Films directed by Alan James
1930s American films